Charles Hare may refer to:

 Charlie Hare (1870–1947), English footballer
 Charles Hare (tennis) (1915–1996), British tennis player
 Charles Simeon Hare (1808–1882), politician in colonial South Australia